Too High to Fail is a book about cannabis by Doug Fine, published by Gotham Books in 2012, describing Northern California's legal cannabis industry.

See also
 List of books about cannabis

References

2012 non-fiction books
American books about cannabis
Cannabis in California
Non-fiction books about cannabis
Gotham Books books